Operation Pacific is a 1951 black-and-white World War II submarine war drama from Warner Bros. Pictures, produced by Louis Edelman, and written as well as directed by George Waggner. John Wayne and Patricia Neal star and Ward Bond and Philip Carey play supporting roles.

Much of the film is set aboard a Gato-class submarine. The technical advisor was World War II Admiral Charles A. Lockwood, Commander, Submarine Forces, Pacific (COMSUBPAC).

Plot
During World War II, the submarine USS Thunderfish, under the command of CDR John T. "Pop" Perry (Ward Bond), while on a special mission to the Philippines takes charge of a group of nuns and children, including a newborn infant nicknamed "Butch", transporting them to Pearl Harbor. On their way, the sub sights a Japanese aircraft carrier and attacks, but its torpedoes malfunction, exploding halfway to the target. Pursued by the carrier's escorting destroyers, Thunderfish manages to escape.

While in Pearl Harbor, the ship's Executive Officer, LCDR Duke E. Gifford (John Wayne) goes to visit Butch at the base hospital, and runs into his ex-wife, LTJG Mary Stuart (Patricia Neal), a Navy nurse, and they kiss passionately. Unfortunately, Mary is now romantically involved with Navy pilot LTJG Bob Perry (Philip Carey), Pop's younger brother. Duke pursues Mary anyway, but is sent to sea again before anything is settled.

As the sub returns from the patrol, they spot a Japanese freighter, but again their torpedoes fail to explode. The enemy ship raises the white flag, and Thunderfish surfaces and approaches. The freighter turns out to be a heavily armed Q-ship that opens fire on the sub. Mortally wounded, Commander Perry orders the boat to crash dive, knowing that he will not be able to get below before she submerges.

With the sub now under Duke's command, he takes the offensive against the Q-ship. He notifies the crew that the boat will "battle surface" after moving into position to attack the ship. On surfacing, Gifford orders the boat's deck guns and anti-aircraft guns, as well as numerous portable light and mountable heavy machine guns operated by the deck crew, to fire at will. After the Q-ship's bridge is disabled and the ship set afire, Duke orders flank speed, ramming the sub into the Japanese ship, holing the engine room and sinking the Q-ship.

Thunderfish, with her forward torpedo room seriously damaged but flooding contained, limps home for repairs. Back at Pearl Harbor, Bob Perry believes that Duke's order to dive the boat killed his brother, and he refuses to listen to Duke's explanation. Mary tries to comfort Duke, but he rejects her attempts, declaring he only did his duty and feels no regret.

Working with the sub base's torpedo specialists, Duke and the crew of the Thunderfish undertake an investigation to find out why the torpedoes are not exploding. When they finally discover the answer, Duke goes to Mary to celebrate, but she rejects him. Since he wouldn't let her into his life when he was at his lowest, she feels that they cannot have a real relationship. Her superior, Cmdr. Steele (Kathryn Givney), overhears the conversation and castigates Mary for throwing away her chance for happiness with Duke.

Once again Thunderfish heads to sea, this time as part of a scouting line searching for a Japanese fleet heading for Leyte to savage the American invasion force there. Thunderfish finds the enemy. Even though it will reveal their presence, Duke broadcasts the fleet's position. Once Pearl Harbor acknowledges the message, Duke salvoes his torpedoes and makes a run for it, throwing the attacking Japanese warships into chaos. Despite enduring a battering from Japanese depth charges, Thunderfish manages to sink a Japanese aircraft carrier.

In the next phase of the battle, American carrier aircraft arrive and attack the Japanese fleet. Thunderfish, now assigned to lifeguard duty, helps to rescue shot down American flyers, and does so while under attack from Japanese fighters. While rescuing LT Bob Perry, the Chief of the Boat and Junior, a seaman from a Navy family, are killed and Duke is wounded by a strafing Japanese Zero.

When the Thunderfish returns to Pearl Harbor after the patrol, Mary is waiting for Duke. The two, reconciled, head to the hospital, intending to adopt Butch.

Cast

 John Wayne as Lt. Cmdr. Duke E. Gifford
 Patricia Neal as Lt. (j.g.) Mary Stuart
 Ward Bond as Cmdr. John T. "Pop" Perry
 Scott Forbes as Lt. Larry
 Philip Carey as Lt. (j.g.) Bob Perry
 Paul Picerni as Jonesy
 William Campbell as the Talker
 Kathryn Givney as Cmdr. Steele
 Martin Milner as Ensign Caldwell
 Cliff Clark as Commander, SUBPAC
 Jack Pennick as the Chief
 Virginia Brissac as Sister Anna
 Vincent Fotre as Soundman
 Lewis Martin as Squad Commander
 Sam Edwards as Junior
 James Flavin Mick Shore Patrol Commander (uncredited)
 Harry Lauter Freddie Commanding Officer Submarine Corvena (uncredited)
 Milburn Stone Ground Control Officer (uncredited)
 Frank Sutton as Chief Gunners Mate (uncredited)
 Louis Mosconi as Radarman Mosconi

Production
John Wayne and Patricia Neal did not get along during filming. Nearly fourteen years later, however, they worked together on In Harm's Way (1965) where she noted that he had mellowed a lot, possibly because he was seriously ill with lung cancer at the time.

The film's opening foreword and dedication states: "When the Pacific Fleet was destroyed by the Japanese sneak attack on Pearl Harbor, it remained for the submarines to carry the war to the enemy. In the four years that followed, our undersea craft sank six million tons of Japanese shipping including some of the proudest ships of the Imperial Navy. Fifty-two of our submarines and thirty-five hundred officers and men were lost. It is to these men and the entire Silent Service that this picture is humbly dedicated."

The special mission shown at the beginning of the movie, in which Navy submarines ran war supplies into the Philippines and evacuated civilians, while idealized is a matter of historic record. By the time of the invasion of the Philippines in 1944, these supply runs had enabled American and Philippine Army officers who had refused to surrender to build a military organization in the islands that was the size of an army corps.

The numerous problems with the Mark 14 torpedo and its Mark VI exploder depicted in the film are accurate. A poorly designed and tested firing pin could malfunction on a good hit (that is, a torpedo striking within about 45 degrees of perpendicular to the side of the target). Poor hits (at a very sharp angle to the side of the ship) could often produce more reliable explosions. Diagnosing the problem actually did occur in a similar manner after 20 months of repeated failures in combat. Submarine crews were involved in the testing, although not in the capacity shown in the film.

Mortally wounded on the bridge, Gilmore gave the order "Take her down!", sacrificing himself to save his submarine and crew, for which he was posthumously awarded the Medal of Honor. The ramming and sinking of the armed freighter depicted in the scene occurred in the same action, just prior to Gilmore's death.

During Operation Pacifics action sequences, for the film's music score, composer Max Steiner incorporates dramatic music stances from his classic score for RKO's King Kong. Warner Brothers also recycled Steiner's main theme music from the 1948 movie Fighter Squadron as the main theme for Operation Pacific. This march was first used as the main title for the 1941 movie Dive Bomber. It would be heard again in the 1963 submarine movie Up Periscope.

Two previous Warner Brothers features are cited within this film: George Washington Slept Here (1942) is traded to another submarine in exchange for Destination Tokyo (1943), of which a few seconds of footage is seen as the crewmen watch it.

Although Ward Bond's character is presented as an elder to John Wayne's, in actuality Bond was only four years older than Wayne. Longtime friends, this was the 12th film they had done together.

The submarine Corveena was an actual submarine, albeit spelled slightly differently.  was commissioned on August 6, 1943, and was torpedoed and sunk by the Japanese submarine  on her first war patrol south of Truk Atoll on November 16, 1943. I-176 outlived her victim by exactly six months, being depth-charged and sunk off Buka Island in the Solomon Islands on May 16, 1944.

Box office performance
According to Warner Bros' accounts the film earned $2,563,000 domestically and $1,300,000 in foreign countries.

See also
 John Wayne filmography

References

External links

 
 
 
 

1951 films
1950s war films
American black-and-white films
American war films
Films scored by Max Steiner
Films directed by George Waggner
Films about the United States Navy in World War II
Warner Bros. films
World War II films based on actual events
World War II submarine films
Films set in the Philippines
1950s English-language films
1950s American films